Saros cycle series 136 for lunar eclipses occurs at the moon's ascending node, 18 years 11 and 1/3 days. It contains 72 events. Solar saros 143 interleaves with this lunar saros with an event occurring every 9 years 5 days alternating between each saros series.

This lunar saros is linked to Solar Saros 143.

List

See also 
 List of lunar eclipses
 List of Saros series for lunar eclipses

Notes

External links 
 www.hermit.org: Saros 136

Lunar saros series